Metallata is a genus of moths in the family Erebidae. The genus was erected by Heinrich Benno Möschler in 1890.

Species
Metallata absumens (Walker, 1862) – variable metallata moth – eastern US to Brazil, Antilles, Venezuela, Galápagos Islands
Metallata antias (Druce, 1891) Panama
Metallata anyte (Druce, 1891) Panama
Metallata arbuscula (Druce, 1891) Panama
Metallata blandita (Schaus, 1912) Costa Rica
Metallata distincta (Schaus, 1901) Brazil (Paraná)
Metallata glycera (Schaus, 1914) French Guiana
Metallata grynia (Dognin, 1912) Colombia, Bolivia
Metallata irrorata (Schaus, 1921) Costa Rica
Metallata moniliaris (Guenée, 1852)

References

Eulepidotinae
Moth genera